Agonidium nyikense is a species of ground beetle in the subfamily Platyninae. It was described by Basilewsky in 1988.

References

nyikense
Beetles described in 1988